Supergiant is a supervillain appearing in American comic books published by Marvel Comics. Created by Jonathan Hickman and Jerome Opeña, Supergiant first appeared in Infinity (October 2013).

The character has made several appearances in other media such as animated television and video games.

Publication history
Supergiant first appeared in Infinity (October 2013) and was created by Jonathan Hickman and Jerome Opeña.

Fictional character biography
Supergiant is a member of Thanos' supervillain team Black Order. While searching for Thanos' son Thane during the Infinity storyline, Supergiant and Corvus Glaive laid siege to the Jean Grey School for Higher Learning and defeated the X-Men. They left after realizing that Thane was not there.

When the Black Order seized Wakanda, Supergiant was left in control of Black Bolt who she would mentally order to activate the Illuminati's hidden bombs in Wakanda Necropolis. When the Illuminati arrived to save Black Bolt, Supergiant used Black Bolt's ability to defeat the heroes. Upon activating the bomb, Supergiant was faced by Maximus who had the trigger. Maximus triggered the bomb, but also used Lockjaw to transport Supergiant along with the bomb to a distant uninhabited planet where she perished in the explosion.

During the "No Surrender" arc, Supergiant came back as a psychic projection, along with the rest of the Black Order, thanks to the Challenger who had set them up against Grandmaster's Lethal Legion. During the battle in Antarctica, the Black Order retreat after Corvus Glaive is killed. Supergiant stays to take control of Thor, but is dissipated by Lethal Legion member Ferene the Other.

Powers and abilities
Supergiant has telepathic abilities, which allow her to mind-control anyone and feed on their intellect. At some point, she was transformed into a psionic entity. Out of her transformation, Supergiant gained the power to phase through living beings and obstacles. She also became immune to physical damage.

Reception

Accolades 

 In 2022, Screen Rant included Supergiant in their "10 Best Cosmic Villains Not Yet In The MCU" list.
 In 2022, CBR.com ranked Supergiant 3rd in their "MCU: Every Member Of Thanos’ Black Order, Ranked By Power" list.

In other media

Television
 Supergiant appears in Avengers Assemble, voiced by Hynden Walch.
 Supergiant appears in Guardians of the Galaxy, voiced again by Hynden Walch. This version lacks psychic powers, but can grow to a gigantic size and previously dated Star-Lord prior to the series' events. In the episode "Undercover Angle", Supergiant is imprisoned by the Nova Corps until the Guardians of the Galaxy accidentally free her while infiltrating the organization, though Gamora is able to subdue her. In the episode "Come and Gut Your Love", Supergiant works with another ex-girlfriend of Star-Lord's, Lucy, to attack him after discovering he is J'son's son.

Video games
 Supergiant appears as a mini-boss in Marvel: Avengers Alliance.
 Supergiant appears as a boss and unlockable playable character in Marvel Future Fight.
 Supergiant appears as a playable character in Lego Marvel Super Heroes 2 as part of the Infinity War DLC.
 Supergiant appears as a boss in Marvel Ultimate Alliance 3: The Black Order, voiced again by Hynden Walch.

References

External links
 Supergiant at Marvel Wiki
 Supergiant at Comic Vine
 

Characters created by Jonathan Hickman
Comics characters introduced in 2013
Fictional hypnotists and indoctrinators
Marvel Comics aliens
Marvel Comics extraterrestrial supervillains
Marvel Comics telepaths
Marvel Comics female supervillains